Pryzm Nottingham is a chain nightclub located on Upper Parliament Street in Nottingham, England.

History 
The site became vacant when Nottingham Prison was demolished. Legend has it that the last person to be hanged in Nottingham was hanged on that very site.
The building was constructed by the Midland Palais de Danse Company and opened as a dance hall and billiard saloon under the name Palais de Danse. The architects were Alfred John Thraves and Henry Hardwick Dawson and the contractors were W. and J. Simons. The building featured a globe and frieze of dancers over the entrance. It opened to invited guests on 22 April 1925 and to the general public 2 days later. 
 
It changed its name to Ritzy, then became simply The Palais, then was Oceana and is now Pryzm, owned by Rekom UK.

It was refurbished in 2005 by Bignell Shacklady Ewing.

References

External links 

Culture in Nottingham
Music venues in Nottinghamshire
Nightclubs in England
Buildings and structures in Nottingham